Westrill and Starmore is a civil parish in the Harborough district of Leicestershire, England. It has no settlement as such as it is one of the least populated parishes in Harborough District, comprising farmland surrounding the track from Stanford Park to Walcote village in the parish of Misterton with Walcote.  The parish is located in the south of the county, on the border with Northamptonshire, between the parishes of Swinford and South Kilworth. The principal building in the parish is Stanford Hall, Leicestershire.
To the south-east it faces the Northamptonshire parish of Stanford-on-Avon, across the River Avon.

The parish is the location of a planning application for eleven wind turbines which is to be the subject of a public inquiry in July 2009.

External links
 Parish contact
Parish boundaries

Civil parishes in Harborough District